This is a list of Italian television related events from 1985.

Debuts

RAI

Variety 

 Parola mia (My word) – quiz about the Italian language, hosted by Luciano Rispoli, sided by Anna Carlucci and the university professor Gian Luigi Beccaria; 3 seasons plus a reprisal in 2002. It is a rare example of a TV quiz with a true cultural value.

Fininvest

Variety 

 Forum – court show, with various hosts, all female (Catherine Spaak, Rita dalla Chiesa, Barbara Palombelli); the civil cases are settled by a true magistrate (the most famous is Santi Licheri, who kept the role for 24 years) while, often, the contenders are played by actors. The show, again on air, is one of the most popular Mediaset programs and has generated several spin-offs.
Grand Hotel – mix of variety and sit-com set in a luxury hotel, ideated by Silvio Berlusconi himself, with Daniele Formica, Paolo Villaggio, Franco and Ciccio, Gigi e Andrea and several guest stars playing themselves (the first is Alain Delon) ; 2 seasons.
Doppio slalom (Double slalom) – quiz for teenagers, Italian version of Blockbusters, hosted by Corrado Tedeschi; 6 seasons. In 1988, the future politician Matteo Salvini (by then 15 years old) is champion of the show for three episodes.
Buona domenica (Good Sunday) – interstitial show of the Sunday evening, hosted by Maurizio Costanzo, Lorella Cuccarini and others; 20 seasons.

Shows of the year

RAI

Drama 

 Il minestrone by Sergio Citti, with Roberto Benigni, Franco Citti and Ninetto Davoli, in 3 episodes; a shortened theatrical version had been distributed in 1981.
 The two lives of Mattia Pascal – by Mario Monicelli, from Luigi Pirandello’s The late Mattia Pascal, with Marcello Mastroianni, Flavio Bucci and Laura Morante; in 2 parts.

Miniseries 

 Quo vadis? – by Franco Rossi, from the Henryk Sienkiewicz’s novel, with Francesco Quinn, Marie Therese Relin and Klaus Maria Brandauer (very appreciated in the Nero’s role); European coproduction in 6 episodes.
Christopher Columbus by Alberto Lattuada, with Gabriel Byrne in the title role and a stellar cast in the minor ones (Oliver Reed as Martin Pinzon, Faye Dunaway as Isabella of Castille, Max von Sydow and Eli Wallach); 4 episodes.
Mussolini and I, by Alberto Negrin, with Bo Hoskins (Benito Mussolini), Anthony Hopkins (Galeazzo Ciano) and Susan Sarandon (Edda Ciano), 3 episodes. The serial arouses controversies for the given image of the fascism, judged too benevolent, and for the disappointing Bo Hoskins’ performance.

Variety 

 Il tastomatto (The crazy key) – variety by Enzo Trapani, focused on the parody of the channel surfing; with Pippo Franco, Albano and Romina and, for the first time in television, the trio Anna Marchesini-Tullio Solenghi-Massimo Lopez.
 Quelli della notte (The night people) – variety by Renzo Arbore. The program, often improvised on air, is a demented parody of the talk-shows with absurd guests (the friar Nino Frassica, the Arab Andy Luotto, the communist Maurizio Ferrini, and so on); aired at the 11 p.m. and thought for a niche audience, it gets an extraordinary public and critic success and becomes a cultural phenomenon.
 Buonasera, Raffaella – variety with Raffaella Carrà, evening version of the successful noon program Pronto, Raffaella, in 15 episodes (the last five are broadcast by satellite form the RAI Corporation studios in New York). The show gets high rating but arouses also harsh quarrels and a parliamentary question for the huge costs of the trip to America.

News and educational 

 AIDS story - reportage by Giangi Poli about the spread of AIDS in the United States.

Deaths 

 27 February: Giuseppe (nicknamed Joe) Marrazzo, 56, RAI journalist, famous for his daring reportages about Italian organized crime.

References 

1985 in Italian television